The Fock space is an algebraic construction used in quantum mechanics to construct the quantum states space of a variable or unknown number of identical particles from a single particle Hilbert space . It is named after V. A. Fock who first introduced it in his 1932 paper "Konfigurationsraum und zweite Quantelung" ("Configuration space and second quantization").

Informally, a Fock space is the sum of a set of Hilbert spaces representing zero particle states, one particle states, two particle states, and so on. If the identical particles are bosons, the -particle states are vectors in a symmetrized tensor product of  single-particle Hilbert spaces . If the identical particles are fermions, the -particle states are vectors in an antisymmetrized tensor product of  single-particle Hilbert spaces  (see symmetric algebra and exterior algebra respectively). A general state in Fock space is a linear combination of -particle states, one for each .

Technically, the Fock space is (the Hilbert space completion of) the direct sum of the symmetric or antisymmetric tensors in the tensor powers of a single-particle Hilbert space ,

Here  is the operator which symmetrizes or antisymmetrizes a tensor, depending on whether the Hilbert space describes particles obeying bosonic  or fermionic  statistics, and the overline represents the completion of the space. The bosonic (resp. fermionic) Fock space can alternatively be constructed as (the Hilbert space completion of) the symmetric tensors  (resp. alternating tensors ). For every basis for  there is a natural basis of the Fock space, the Fock states.

Definition 

The Fock space is the (Hilbert) direct sum of tensor products of copies of a single-particle Hilbert space 

Here , the complex scalars, consists of the states corresponding to no particles,  the states of one particle,  the states of two identical particles etc.

where

The convergence of this infinite sum is important if  is to be a Hilbert space. Technically we require  to be the Hilbert space completion of the algebraic direct sum. It consists of all infinite tuples  such that the norm, defined by the inner product is finite

where the  particle norm is defined by

i.e., the restriction of the norm on the tensor product 

For two general states
 and

where we use the inner products on each of the -particle Hilbert spaces. Note that, in particular the  particle subspaces are orthogonal for different .

Product states, indistinguishable particles, and a useful basis for Fock space 
A product state of the Fock space is a state of the form

which describes a collection of  particles, one of which has quantum state , another  and so on up to the th particle, where each  is any state from the single particle Hilbert space . Here juxtaposition (writing the single particle kets side by side, without the ) is symmetric (resp. antisymmetric) multiplication in the symmetric (antisymmetric) tensor algebra. The general state in a Fock space is a linear combination of product states. A state that cannot be written as a convex sum of product states is called an entangled state.

When we speak of one particle in state , we must bear in mind that in quantum mechanics identical particles are indistinguishable. In the same Fock space, all particles are identical. (To describe many species of particles, we take the tensor product of as many different Fock spaces as there are species of particles under consideration). It is one of the most powerful features of this formalism that states are implicitly properly symmetrized. This is a mathematical formulation of the Pauli exclusion principle that no two (or more) fermions can be in the same quantum state. In fact, whenever the terms in a formal product are linearly dependent; the product will be zero for antisymmetric tensors. Also, the product of orthonormal states is properly orthonormal by construction (although possibly 0 in the Fermi case when two states are equal).

A useful and convenient basis for a Fock space is the occupancy number basis.
 particles in state ,
 particles in state , ...,  particles in state , and no particles in the remaining states, by defining

where each  takes the value 0 or 1 for fermionic particles and 0, 1, 2, ... for bosonic particles. Note that trailing zeroes may be dropped without changing the state. Such a state is called a Fock state. The most general Fock state is a linear superposition of pure states.

Two operators of great importance are the creation and annihilation operators, which upon acting on a Fock state add or respectively remove a particle in the ascribed quantum state. They are denoted  for creation and for annihilation respectively. It is often convenient to work with states of the basis of  so that these operators remove and add exactly one particle in the given basis state.

Wave function interpretation 

The typical example is the free particle with  the space of square integrable functions on three-dimensional space. The Fock spaces then have a natural interpretation as symmetric or anti-symmetric square integrable functions as follows.

Consider the space of tuples of points which is the disjoint union

The even Fock space  can then be identified with the space of symmetric functions in  whereas the odd Fock space  can be identified with the space of anti-symmetric functions. The identification follows directly from the isometric mapping

.

Given wave functions , the Slater determinant

It can thus be naturally interpreted as an element of the -particle sector of the odd Fock space. The normalization is chosen such that  if the functions  are orthonormal. There is a similar "Slater permanent" with the determinant replaced with the permanent which gives elements of -sector of the even Fock space.

Relation to the Segal–Bargmann space 

Define the Segal–Bargmann space  of complex holomorphic functions square-integrable with respect to a Gaussian measure:

where

Then defining a space  as the nested union of the spaces  over the integers , Segal and Bargmann showed that  is isomorphic to a bosonic Fock space. The monomial

corresponds to the Fock state

See also

 Fock state
 Tensor algebra
 Holomorphic Fock space
 Creation and annihilation operators
 Slater determinant
 Wick's theorem
 Noncommutative geometry
 Grand canonical ensemble, thermal distribution over Fock space

References

External links
Feynman diagrams and Wick products associated with q-Fock space - noncommutative analysis, Edward G. Effros and Mihai Popa, Department of Mathematics, UCLA
 R. Geroch, Mathematical Physics, Chicago University Press, Chapter 21.

Quantum mechanics
Quantum field theory